Koldok is an unincorporated community in Barnes County, North Dakota, United States. The unincorporated community takes its name from the presence of a large coal storage facility, Coal-dock, having first had to change its name from Brackett due to the latter's similarity with Brocket.

References

Unincorporated communities in Barnes County, North Dakota
Unincorporated communities in North Dakota